This is a list of advanced primer ignition blowback firearms (API).

Assault Rifles

Anti Tank Rifles

Grenade Launchers

Submachine Guns

Shotguns

References

Firearm actions
API blowback